The women's 400 metres hurdles at the 2019 World Athletics Championships was held at the Khalifa International Stadium in Doha, Qatar, from 1 to 4 October 2019.

Summary
Throughout the 2019 season two names topped the 400 hurdles list.  The same two topped the semi-final round.  Dalilah Muhammad and Sydney McLaughlin, but which one would be the favorite?  McLaughlin had more superior times and had beaten Muhammad 2 to 1.  The 1, Muhammad had to set the world record to beat McLaughlin and win the USA Championships on a rain soaked track in Des Moines.  And McLaughlin was still improving.  She ran those fast times while still a teenager, turning 20 late in the season.

In the final, Muhammad did what she had to do, she went out hard.  She was first over the first hurdle and continued to pull ahead, making up the stagger on Sage Watson to her outside before the end of the turn.  But McLaughlin was not giving up too much ground, two lanes to the inside, passing Rushell Clayton between them just after entering the backstretch.  Before the end of the backstretch, Muhammad had made up another stagger on two time World Champion Zuzana Hejnová.  Through the final turn, both were well in front, Muhammad taking the hurdles about a full stride ahead of McLaughlin.  When they hit the home straight, Muhammad had about a 3 metre lead.  That gap stayed consistent over the final two barriers, but coming off the final hurdle, McLaughlin made up a meter in the first three steps and she was coming on fast.  The gap was closing as the finish line neared.  Both athletes leaned for the line with Muhammad holding on for a half metre victory.  Clayton finished a second and a half back to take bronze.

Muhammad had beaten her own world record set just two months earlier by .04.  She ran 52.16.  McLaughlin had run the #3 time in history, 52.23.  The only thing separating the two was Muhammad's previous world record run.  Just as in the 1995 World Championships, two American hurdlers had pushed each other to be the #1 and 2 performers in history.

Records
Before the competition records were as follows:

The following records were established during the competition:

Schedule
The event schedule, in local time (UTC+3), is as follows:

Results

Heats
The first four in each heat (Q) and the next four fastest (q) qualified for the semifinal.

Semi-finals
The first 2 in each heat (Q) and the next two fastest (q) qualified for the final.

Final
The final was started on 4 October at 21:30.

References

External |Links

Women's 400 metres hurdles
400 metres hurdles at the World Athletics Championships